Dune is a feature on Earth's Moon, a crater in the Hadley–Apennine region.  Astronauts David Scott and James Irwin visited the south rim of it in 1971, on the Apollo 15 mission, during EVA 2.  The south rim of Dune was designated Geology Station 4 of the mission.

Dune is located about 1.8 km east of Hadley Rille, less than 1 km south of the smaller Earthlight crater, and about 3 km south of the Apollo 15 landing site itself.

The crater was named by the astronauts after the 1965 novel by Frank Herbert, and the name was formally adopted by the IAU in 1973.

Samples

The following samples were collected from Dune Crater (Station 4), as listed in Table 5-II of the Apollo 15 Preliminary Science Report.  Sample type, lithology, and description are from Table 5-IV of the same volume.

Samples 15470 to 15476 were collected near where the rover was parked to the south of the rim of Dune.  Samples 15485, 15486, and 15499 were collected from the largest boulder in the photograph above.  Sample 15498 was collected nearby.

External links
 Apollo 15 Traverses, Lunar Photomap 41B4S4(25)

References

Impact craters on the Moon